Huyou (忽悠, Pinyin: hūyōu) is a Chinese word often used by speakers of the Chinese language to refer to bragging.

It comes from Northeast China Dialect, which originally means that making someone falling into a dizzy status and lose his judgement about something. This word becomes popular in China since Zhao Benshan, Fan Wei and Gao Xiumin's comedy played in 2001 CCTV New Year's Gala.

This comedy becomes such a success that "HuYou" has become a popular word in whole China mainland.

References

Chinese words and phrases